The Faculty of Science of Eötvös Loránd University was founded in 1949 and it is located in Lágymányos Campus, Újbuda, Budapest, Hungary.

History 
The Faculty of Science was established on 16 May 1949. In order to develop and improve the teaching of natural sciences, a separate faculty, the Faculty of Science was created from 22 departments and one institute. Before 1949, the Faculty of Humanities, Sciences, Law and Political Science and Medicine constituted one big faculty. The new faculty consisted of 5 institutes: the Institute of Biology, the Institute of Physics, the Institute of Geography, the Institute of Chemistry, and the Institute of Mathematics.

In 2005, József Gál along with Victor Benno Meyer-Rochow of the Jacobs University Bremen was awarded with the ig Nobel Prize.

In 2010, our former student, Judit Nagy, died in a traffic accident at the age of 47. Nagy became a leading scientist in biochemistry at Imperial College London.

In 2021, László Lovász, along with Avi Wigderson of the Institute for Advanced Study in Princeton, was awarded with an Abel prize.

During the Covid-19 pandemic, the dean, Imre Kacskovics, was often interviewed and worked as a consultant for the Hungarian prime minister, Viktor Orbán.

On 31 2021, the Faculty's former student, Árpád Pusztai, died. He made a career at The Rowett Institute in Aberdeen Scotland. He was known for his research in biochemistry and the Pusztai affair.

The European Commission appointed three new members to the governing body of the leading European scientific organisation, including László Lovász, professor of mathematics at Faculty and former President of the Hungarian Academy of Sciences on 1 March 2022.

During the Russo-Ukrainian War, free courses were offered for Ukrainian students.

In April 2022, new quantum processors were purchases by Eötvös Loránd University.

According to the AD scientific index, among the top 10 most influential scientist at the Eötvös Loránd University are from the Faculty of Science.

On 1 July 2022, Katalin Karikó, Hungarian-American biochemist who specializes in RNA-mediated mechanisms, was awarded with an honorary doctorate.

Institutes

Deans 

Aladár Buzágh: 1949–1950 
György Hajós: 1950–1951
Tibor Erdey-Grúz: 1950–1951
Ferenc Kárteszi: 1951–1954
László Fuchs: 1954–1956
Gusztáv Mödlinger: 1953–1958
Sándor Lengyel: 1958–1961
Károly Nagy: 1961–1966
Kálmán Sztrókay: 1967–1968
László Egyed: 1966–1967 and 1968–1970
Imre Kátai: 1970–1977
Imre Kubovics: 1977–1983
Kálmán Medzihradszky: 1983–1989
István Klinghammer: 1989–1990
Ádám Kiss: 1990–1997
András Benczúr: 1997–2001
Ferenc Láng: 2001–2005
György Michaletzky: 2005–2012
Péter Surján: 2012–2018
Péter Sziklai: 2018–2019
Imre Kacskovics: 2019–present

Research 
In 2015, András Kovács, researcher at the Institute of Geography and Earth Sciences, was interviewed by the Guardian on his group's discovery. His research team found a supervoid. In other words, the largest structure was discovered in the universe.

A research group's, led by Attila Andics, study was featured in Forbes. The title of the article was "Science Reveals How Your Pet Really Feels About Your Affection".

In 2018, a research group, led by Gábor Horváth, successfully modelled the Kordylewski clouds.

Zsolt Demetrovics's study was featured on the Guardian entitled Cyberchondria and cyberhoarding: is internet fuelling new conditions?

A study conducted by a research group of the Faculty of Science was featured in the BBC, entitled Separation from your phone 'makes you stressed within minutes.

In an article entitled Cows Can Be Toilet Trained, A New Study Suggests. This Has Implications For The Environment And Animal Welfare, published on Forbes, Paula Perez Fraga was interviewed on dog and pig behaviour.

In 2020, Gergely Balázs's study on salamanders was featured in USA Today. He found that a rare olm salamander didn't move for more than seven years. The results of his study was published in the Journal of Zoology in 2020.

A study, led by Ádám Miklósi, was featured on USAToday.com, entitled "Why is your dog tilting its head? New study dives into the adorable habit". The findings of their study was published in Animal Cognition, entitled 'An exploratory analysis of head-tilting in dogs'.

In 2022, a study conducted by Laura Cuaya, from the Department of Ethology of the Institute of Biology, was featured in the BBC. Another study, led by Attila Andics, was also featured in the BBC entitled 'Dogs can recognise their owners by their voice alone'.

Notable researchers

Notable alumni 

The following is a list of scientists who achieved success worldwide:

János Aczél, mathematician
Miklós Ajtai, computer scientist
Béla Andrásfai, mathematician
Hajnal Andréka, mathematician
Gergely Arató, politician and Members of the National Assembly of Hungary (2018–2022)
László Babai, mathematician and computer scientist
Zsolt Baranyai, mathematician
Emanuel Beke, mathematician
Gyula Bereznai, mathematician
Károly Bezdek, mathematician
Béla Bollobás, mathematician
Miklós Bóna, mathematician
Ákos Császár, mathematician
Imre Csiszár, mathematician
Marianna Csörnyei, mathematician
György Elekes, mathematician
Loránd Eötvös, physicist
Pál Erdős, mathematician
László Fejes Tóth, mathematician
Gyula Farkas, mathematician
István Fáry, mathematician
Lipót Fejér, mathematician
István Fenyő, mathematician
Péter Frankl, mathematician
László Fuchs, mathematician
Zoltán Füredi, mathematician
Peter Gacs, mathematician
Janos Galambos, mathematician
Tibor Gallai, mathematician
Zoárd Geőcze, mathematician
George Grätzer, mathematician
András Gyárfás, mathematician
András Hajnal, mathematician
György Hevessy, chemist
John Horvath, mathematician
Imre Izsák, mathematician
Benedek Jávor, politician
Ányos Jedlik, physicist
István Juhász, mathematician
László Kalmár, mathematician
Frigyes Károlyházy, mathematician
Gyula O. H. Katona, mathematician
Béla Kerékjártó, mathematician
Péter Kiss, mathematician
Lipót Klug, mathematician
János Kollár, mathematician
János Komlós, mathematician
Gábor Korchmáros, mathematician
András Kornai, mathematician
Lajos Kossuth, politician
János Körner, mathematician
József Kürschák, mathematician
Miklós Laczkovich, mathematician
Cornelius Lanczos, mathematician
László Lempert, mathematician
László Lovász, mathematician
Elod Macskasy, mathematician
Michael Makkai, mathematician
Katalin Marton, mathematician
Pál Medgyessy, mathematician
Paul G. Mezey, chemist
János Neumann, physicist
Gyula J. Obádovics, mathematician
Géza Ottlik, writer, translator, mathematician
János Pach, mathematician
Péter Pál Pálfy, mathematician
János Pintz, mathematician
Michael Polanyi, polymath
George Pólya, mathematician
Lajos Pósa, mathematician
András Prékopa, mathematician
László Rátz, mathematician
László Rédei, mathematician
Marcel Riesz, mathematician
Alfréd Rényi, mathematician
Gedeon Richter, pharmacist
Imre Ritter, mathematician
Elizabeth Rona, chemist
Imre Z. Ruzsa, mathematician
Rózsa Péter, mathematician
Gábor N. Sárközy, mathematician
András Sebő, mathematician
Ignác Semmelweis, 
Simon Sidon, mathematician
Miklós Simonovits, mathematician
József Solymosi, mathematician
Rebeka Szabó, politician
Zoltán Szabó, mathematician
Ottó Szász, mathematician
Mario Szegedy, mathematician
Albert Szent-Györgyi, biochemist
Éva Tardos, mathematician
Károly Than, chemist
Van H. Vu, mathematician
Vera T. Sós, mathematician

Library
The Library of the Faculty of Science is located on the Lágymányos Campus in Pázmány Péter sétány. The library has five collections:  

 Biological collection
 Geographical and earth sciences collection
 Physics collection
 Chemistry collection
 Mathematical collection

Gallery

References

External links

Eötvös Loránd University
Újbuda